Niles Littlebig is an album by Randy Weston's African Rhythms recorded in 1969 in Paris and originally released on the French Polydor label.

Track listing 
All compositions by Randy Weston except as indicated
 "Little Niles" - 5:27
 "Niger Mambo" (Bobby Benson) - 8:54
 "C.W. Blues" - 5:05   
 "Pam's Waltz" - 3:01    
 "Hi-Fly" - 4:12    
 "Penny Packer Blues" - 4:54    
 "Waltz for Sweet Cakes" - 3:09    
 "Out of the Past" - 3:30

Personnel 
Randy Weston - piano
Henry Texier - bass 
Art Taylor - drums 
Azzedin Niles Weston, Reebop Kwaku Baah - percussion
Thierry Maindrault - photography

References 

Randy Weston albums
1969 albums
Polydor Records albums